Unavailability, in mathematical terms, is the probability that an item will not operate correctly at a given time and under specified conditions. It opposes availability.

Numerical values associated with the calculation of availability are often awkward, consisting of a series of 9s before reaching any significant numerical information (e.g. 0.9999999654). For this reason, it is more convenient to use the complement measure of availability, namely, unavailability. Expressed mathematically, unavailability is 1 minus the availability. Therefore, a system with availability 0.9999999654 is more concisely described as having an unavailability of 3.46 × 10−8.

Calculations using unavailability 
Often fault trees and reliability block diagrams will use unavailability of the various components in the calculation of the top level failure rates through AND gates or parallel redundant components.

Repairable Model 
Unavailability (Q), using the repairable model, may be expressed mathematically by the equation:

 

where MTTR is the mean time to repair, and MTBF is the mean time between failures of a repairable system. Alternatively, this can be written as:

 

where λ is the failure rate and μ is the repair rate. When μ >> λ, the preceding formula is often approximated to:

Non-Repairable Model 
For the non-repairable model of unavailability (Q), the unreliability function (often F(t) the CDF of the exponential distribution) is used to approximate the worst-case-unavailability. If the rate of failure is constant the Poisson distribution and exponential distribution describe this rate. The unreliability function approximating the worst case unavailability is as follows:

Q = 1 - e-λt

Where t is the time at risk.

Telecommunications 
In telecommunication, an unavailability is an expression of the degree to which a system, subsystem, or equipment is not operable and not in a committable state at the start of a mission, when the mission is called for at an unknown, i.e. random, time. The conditions determining operability and committability must be specified.

Railway 
In the railway industry, the railway normally keeps operating for 24 hours a day 7 days per week all year round making the idea of mission time meaningless. Both the repairable model and non-repairable model are known to be used in railway. The repairable model is used for total system availability or unavailability and the non-repairable model is used for system safety. Safe down time is the time between when a wrong side failure happens and when it is detected and mitigated.

Aerospace 
The aerospace industry often uses a mission time equal to the expected flight time given that certain pre-flight tests are performed.

Space 
The mission time for space systems may be as long as a satellite or system in orbit. Space systems are exceedingly difficult to repair making mission time a consideration when evaluating unavailability.

References

Systems engineering